Tobias Barrington Wolff (born 1970) is a professor of law at the University of Pennsylvania Law School where he teaches classes on sexuality and the law, same sex marriage and human rights. He is known for his legal advocacy on same sex marriage and other LGBT-related issues, and served as the chief advisor and spokesperson on LGBT issues for Barack Obama throughout his 2007-08 presidential campaign. He is openly gay.

Biography
Wolff was educated at Yale University (BA 1992) and Yale Law School (JD 1997), where he transferred after his first year. At Yale, he wrote for the Yale Law Journal.  After clerking for Ninth Circuit Federal Appeals Court judges William A. Norris and Betty Fletcher, Wolff spent two years as an associate at Paul, Weiss before beginning his academic legal career.  He has taught at UC Davis, Stanford, and Northwestern Law Schools. He is currently professor of law at the University of Pennsylvania.

Wolff is the youngest son of the philosopher Robert Paul Wolff and the brother of chess grandmaster Patrick Wolff.

Bibliography

References

External links
 Faculty profile at Penn Law

1970 births
Living people
20th-century American Jews
American LGBT people
LGBT Jews
Gay men
University of Pennsylvania Law School faculty
Yale Law School alumni
Yale University alumni
Paul, Weiss, Rifkind, Wharton & Garrison people
Scholars of civil procedure law
21st-century American Jews